La Barre – Ormesson is a railway station in the commune of Deuil-la-Barre (Val-d'Oise department), France. The station is served by Transilien H trains, on the lines from Paris to Persan-Beaumont and Pontoise. The daily number of passengers was between 2,500 and 7,500 in 2002.

History
La Barre-Ormesson is located on the original Paris – Lille line, which was opened on 20 June 1846 by Compagnie des chemins de fer du Nord (North Railway Company). This line passed along the Montmorency Valley (Ermont-Eaubonne), and headed towards the northeast at Saint-Ouen-l'Aumône, continuing through the Oise valley. In 1859, a more direct line along Chantilly was opened. The Paris–Pontoise line was electrified in 1969.

Service
The station is served every 15 minutes and eight trains an hour during peak hours. It takes 9 to 15 minutes to reach Paris.

Bus connections
RATP; 256, 356 and 556

See also
List of SNCF stations in Île-de-France

References

External links

 

Railway stations in Val-d'Oise
Railway stations in France opened in 1891